Señor Americano is a 1929 American western film directed by Harry Joe Brown and starring Ken Maynard, Kathryn Crawford and Frank Beal. It was distributed by Universal Pictures. Produced during the transition to sound, it was released in both sound and silent versions.

Synopsis
An American cavalry officer goes undercover in order to pursue a gang of bandits in California in the years before statehood.

Cast
 Ken Maynard as Lieutenant Michael Banning
 Kathryn Crawford as 	Carmelita DeAccosta
 Frank Beal as Don Manuel DeAccosta
 Frank Yaconelli as Mañana
 J.P. McGowan as 	Maddox
 Gino Corrado as 	Carlos Ramirez

References

Bibliography
 Munden, Kenneth White. The American Film Institute Catalog of Motion Pictures Produced in the United States, Part 1. University of California Press, 1997.

External links
 

1920s American films
1929 films
1929 Western (genre) films
1920s English-language films
 American Western (genre) films
American black-and-white films
Films directed by Harry Joe Brown
Universal Pictures films
Films set in California
Films set in the 19th century